East Kilbride West is one of the 20 electoral wards of South Lanarkshire Council. Created in 2007, the ward elects three councillors using the single transferable vote electoral system and covers an area with a population of 13,737 people.

The ward has politically been split between the Scottish National Party (SNP), Labour and the Conservatives. Each party had held one of the three seats from the ward's creation until Cllr David Watson resigned from the SNP to become an independent in 2018. The 2022 election saw the SNP regain their seat from the Conservatives.

Boundaries
The ward was created following the Fourth Statutory Reviews of Electoral Arrangements ahead of the 2007 Scottish local elections. As a result of the Local Governance (Scotland) Act 2004, local elections in Scotland would use the single transferable vote electoral system from 2007 onwards so East Kilbride West was formed from an amalgamation of several previous first-past-the-post wards. It contained the majority of the former Stewartfield ward, part of the previous Hairmyres/Crosshouse and Lindsay wards as well as all of the former Mossneuk/Kittoch ward and a small area from each of the former East Mains and West Mains wards. East Kilbride West covers an area in the west of South Lanarkshire next to its boundaries with Glasgow City Council and East Renfrewshire Council. Its territory covers the parts of East Kilbride on the north-west and western peripheries of the town, including the neighbourhoods of Gardenhall, Hairmyres, Mossneuk, Nerston (the brownfield residential developments, but not the older separate hamlet), Newlandsmuir, Philipshill  and Stewartfield, plus the College Milton industrial area and the outlying village of Thorntonhall. Following the Fifth Statutory Reviews of Electoral Arrangements ahead of the 2017 Scottish local elections, the ward's boundaries were not changed.

Councillors

Election results

2022 election

2017 election

2012 election

2010 by-election

2007 election

Notes

References

Wards of South Lanarkshire
East Kilbride